Kragerø is a town and municipality in Vestfold og Telemark county, Norway. It is part of the traditional regions of Grenland and the smaller Vestmar. The administrative centre of the municipality is the town of Kragerø. The city of Kragerø lies furthest south in the county of Telemark.

The London-based newspaper The Independent, published an article on Kragerø stating that "When Norwegians want to get away from it all they head for Kragero. Forests, fjords and islands await them at the place where Edvard Munch found peace and relaxation." The population of Kragerø quadruples during its summer months due to high tourism. Edvard Munch fell in love with Kragerø in his time, and called it "The Pearl of the Coastal Towns" (Perlen blandt kystbyene). In 2002, The Independent published an article on the region's coastline saying that "It may not have many sandy beaches, but the coast of Norway offers sophistication and stunning scenery."

General information

Name
The Norse form of the name was Krákarey. The first element is (probably) the genitive of kráka 'crow', the last element is ey 'island'. Kragerø is a Danish form of the name, established in the 17th century.

For a similar name see Kråkerøy.

Coat-of-arms
The coat-of-arms is from modern times. They were granted on 28 January 1938. The arms are black with a silver galley in the center. Kragerø received town privileges in 1666, but was dependent on Skien until 1842. The town used a seal which was identical to that of Skien. The galley in the arms is derived from the fact that since 1666, Kragerø had to supply a galley with five guns to the King.

History

The town of Kragerø was established as a municipality on 1 January 1838 (see formannskapsdistrikt). In the days of the sailing ships, Kragerø was one of Norway's largest port cities. The rural municipalities of Sannidal and Skåtøy were merged into the municipality of Kragerø on 1 January 1960. The municipality now includes 495 islands, islets, and skerries along with 4,000 leisure houses. There are also 190 freshwater lakes in the municipality.

1694 murder
On 17 August 1694 Christian Hansen Ernst was killed at present-day Knivstikkersmauet ("knife stabber alley"). He was an employee of the postal service, and a former servant Ulrik Fredrik Gyldenløve, and one of few Africans of the time living in Norway, whose identity is known.

Geography

Kragerø is the southernmost municipality in Telemark. To the southwest, it borders the municipality of Risør (in Aust-Agder county); to the west is Gjerstad (also in Aust-Agder county); to the northwest is Drangedal; and to the northeast is Bamble. Kragerø is popular among Norwegians (as well as foreigners) as a vacation destination during the summer, when the population swells considerably (approx. 250% increase).

Villages
Villages in Kragerø include Helle, Sannidal, Skåtøy, Stråholmen, Jomfruland, and Portør.

Notable residents

 Anton Martin Schweigaard (1808–1870), Norwegian jurist and economic reformer
 Nels Anderson (born 1828), member of the Wisconsin State Assembly
 Johan Christian Heuch (1838–1904) a Norwegian Bishop of the Diocese of Agder
 Theodor Kittelsen (1857–1914), painter; also illustrated fairy tales, legends and trolls
 Hans Daae (1865–1926) a Norwegian physician, military officer and sports official
 Johan Søhr (1867–1949) a Norwegian jurist and police officer
 Thomas Krag (1868–1913) a Norwegian novelist, playwright and writer of short stories
 Samson Eitrem (1872–1966) a philologist, expert in ancient literature, religion and magic
 Edvard Amundsen (1873–1928) a Lutheran missionary in China and Tibet and an explorer
 Inge Debes (1882–1945) a Norwegian jurist, editor and politician
 Ronald Fangen (1895–1946) a novelist, playwright, psalmist, journalist and literary critic
 Eugen Skjønberg (1889–1971) a Norwegian actor 
 Kirsten Heiberg (1907–1976) a Norwegian/German actress and singer 
 Else Heiberg (1910–1972) a Norwegian actress 
 Ole Myrvoll (1911–1988), professor of economics, liberal politician, Minister of Finance
 Carsten Hopstock (1924–2014) art historian, curator of Norwegian Museum of Cultural History
 Alf Cranner (1936-2020) folk singer, lyricist and painter; lived in Kragerø from the 1960s
 Robert Mood (born 1958), Major General, Head of the United Nations Supervision Mission in Syria (UNSMIS)

Sport 
 Olaf Ørvig (1889–1939) a sailor, team gold medallist at the 1920 Summer Olympics
 Knut Lundstrøm (born 1951), athlete, winter paralympian
 Geir Borgan Paulsen (born 1957), IFBB Pro bodybuilder
 Preben Fjære Brynemo (born 1977) a Nordic combined skier, competed at the 2002 Winter Olympics

International relations

Twin towns — Sister cities
The following cities are twinned with Kragerø:

References

External links

Municipal fact sheet from Statistics Norway

Kragerø Municipality 
Kragerø city 
Gigapan from Kragerø 

 
Municipalities of Vestfold og Telemark
Cities and towns in Norway
Populated places in Vestfold og Telemark
Port cities and towns in Norway
Port cities and towns of the North Sea
Islands of Vestfold og Telemark